Okaiawa or Ōkaiawa is a rural community in South Taranaki, New Zealand. It is located about 14 kilometres north-west of Hāwera, north of State Highway 45 and State Highway 3. The settlement is located south-east of Mount Taranaki, close to Inaka River.

According to the New Zealand Ministry for Culture and Heritage, Okaiawa translates as place of food. Ō means "place of"; kai means "food"; and awa means "river or valley".

History

19th century

Okaiawa Public School was established in 1884. The original school house was built of wood and iron, with two classrooms, two porches, and a teachers' residence on site. The school could accommodate a roll of 120 children.

Frank Bremer, a Taranaki farmer originally from Adelaide, purchased a property in Okaiawa in 1890. His farm covered 284 acres of freehold land and 316 of leasehold land. He became a breeder of high-class draught horses which won several races, was president of the local racing club, and milked about 100 cows.

In the 1880s, Thomas Joll established a chain of private dairy factories, based in Okaiawa. He opened a creamery three kilometres from the settlement in 1894. The chain became a cooperative when Joll died in 1908, and Joll was commemorated with a marble bust at the local park named in his honour.

By 1908, the township had a hotel, a store, a butchery, and electricity. The farming community was growing, and the school roll was averaging about 92 children. A Māori Methodist minister was living in the township.

20th century

Eleven local men died in World War I and dozens of others served in the war. A roll of honour was unveiled at the school in 1919 for two ex-pupils who died and 39 other ex-pupils who served. Another roll of honour was unveiled at the local St Aidan's Anglican Church the following year. A memorial statue was unveiled at Joll Park on Anzac Day 1922 for the town's fallen soldiers. An individual memorial was erected at Okaiawa Cemetery for Frank Williams, one of the men who died.

By 1922, 198 students were enrolled in Okaiawa School. At an annual school picnic, parents were reminded to send their children to school "regularly" to keep attendance high.

Three local men died in World War II, and 52 others served in the war. A memorial feature on a brick feature at the school pool was unveiled by Minister of Internal Affairs William Bodkin on 10 March 1952, listing all the men's names.

Okaiawa School celebrated its 75th Jubilee in 1958. By this stage, many students were travelling to Manaia High School for secondary education.

21st century

The New Zealand Government proposed merging Okaiawa School with Manaia School in 2004. Okaiawa School closed permanently in 2009. The World War II plaque at the school was moved to a new wall of river stones at Okaiawa Cemetery in 2009. The location of the school's World War I memorial is unknown.

A woman was charged with arson and endangering life, after a suspicious house fire in Okaiawa in February 2021.

Demographics

There were 450 households. There were 615 males and 567 females, giving a sex ratio of 1.08 males per female. The median age was 38.8 years (compared with 37.4 years nationally), with 282 people (23.9%) aged under 15 years, 168 (14.2%) aged 15 to 29, 597 (50.5%) aged 30 to 64, and 135 (11.4%) aged 65 or older.

Ethnicities were 86.8% European/Pākehā, 21.3% Māori, 1.0% Pacific peoples, 1.8% Asian, and 2.0% other ethnicities (totals add to more than 100% since people could identify with multiple ethnicities).

The proportion of people born overseas was 8.4%, compared with 27.1% nationally.

Although some people objected to giving their religion, 49.0% had no religion, 39.6% were Christian, 0.3% were Hindu, 0.3% were Buddhist and 2.8% had other religions.

Of those at least 15 years old, 96 (10.7%) people had a bachelor or higher degree, and 216 (24.0%) people had no formal qualifications. The median income was $38,900, compared with $31,800 nationally. The employment status of those at least 15 was that 486 (54.0%) people were employed full-time, 162 (18.0%) were part-time, and 33 (3.7%) were unemployed.

References

Populated places in Taranaki
South Taranaki District